This is a list of shopping malls in Italy with more than 100 shops.

References

Italy
Shopping malls